Louise Allen (c. 1840–1911) was a popular American actress in the mid 19th century who was billed under her married name, Mrs. J. H. Allen.Mrs. J.H. Allen c. 1840-1911, Storied Women of Civil War Era (Smithsonian Institution), Retrieved 6 January 2022

She was the wife of theater manager J.H. Allen and debuted on the stage in 1855.  In June 1858, The New York Times described her as "the most beautiful woman on the New York stage, and a lady who in a short time has assumed a prominent position as the leading actress at the principal New York Theatre", referring to Wallack's Theatre.  She appeared in the 1859 melodrama The Octoroon, and in the popular 1860–61 extravaganza The Seven Sisters in New York.

References

External links

1840s births
1911 deaths
19th-century American actresses
American stage actresses